The Armagh Junior Football Championship is an annual Gaelic football competition contested by lower-tier Armagh GAA clubs. The Armagh County Board of the Gaelic Athletic Association has organised it since 1925. The national media covers the competition.

Naomh Mochua Derrynoose are the title holders (2022) defeating Lissummon in the Final.

History
From the launch of the Junior Championship in 1925 until 2013, five clubs won the title four times, with 42 other clubs winning it at least once.

The 2020 final went to a replay.

Honours
The trophy presented to the winners is the Sean Quinn Perpetual Cup. The Armagh JFC winners qualify for the Ulster Junior Club Football Championship. It is the only team from County Armagh to qualify for this competition. The Armagh JFC winners may enter the Ulster Junior Club Football Championship at either the preliminary round or the quarter-final stage. 2005's winning club Clonmore advanced to that year's Ulster Club JFC final. 2012's winning club An Port Mór went on to win the 2012 Ulster Club JFC.

The Armagh JFC winners — by winning the Ulster Junior Club Football Championship — may qualify for the All-Ireland Junior Club Football Championship, at which they would enter at the semi-final stage, providing they haven't been drawn to face the British champions in the quarter-finals.

List of finals

Notes
† The 1964 winner was probably an amalgamated Dorsey and Cullyhanna team, Tom Williams GFC.

References

External links
 Armagh GAA Website

Gaelic football competitions in County Armagh
Junior Gaelic football county championships